"All Nite (Don't Stop)" is a song recorded by American singer Janet Jackson for her eighth studio album, Damita Jo (2004). It was written and produced by Jackson and Swedish duo Bag & Arnthor (consisting of Anders Bagge and Arnthor Birgisson), with additional writing from Jimmy Jam and Terry Lewis. Virgin Records released the song on May 17, 2004, as the album's third and final single. "All Nite (Don't Stop)" is an electro-funk and house song that contains elements of samba, Latin, dance-pop, and dancehall. Jackson sings the song in a breathy falsetto, with lyrical metaphors comparing various actions to dancing.

"All Nite (Don't Stop)" received critical acclaim from music critics, with many praising it as the best song on the album. Its chart performance was massively affected by the blacklisting of Jackson's work on many radio formats and music channels worldwide, regarding conglomerates fined by the U.S. Federal Communications Commission (FCC) after her Super Bowl halftime show incident. However, it peaked atop Hot Dance Club Songs and reached number eight on Hot Dance Airplay, while reaching the top 20 in Spain and the United Kingdom, as well as charting in several other countries. It additionally won a BMI London Award for Best Pop Song.

Its accompanying music video, directed by Francis Lawrence, portrays Jackson and her dancers rehearsing in an abandoned hotel during a power outage. The music video received nominations for Best Dance Video at the International Dance Music Awards and Best Choreography at the MVPA Awards. In order to promote both the single and the album, Jackson performed "All Nite (Don't Stop)" during several appearances, including Saturday Night Live, On Air with Ryan Seacrest and Top of the Pops, in addition to the 2004 Video Music Awards Japan. The song was also performed on all of her subsequent tours following its release.

Background
"All Nite (Don't Stop)" was written and produced by Jackson and Swedish producers Bag & Arnthor of Murlyn Music, with additional writing from Jimmy Jam and Terry Lewis. The song was among several songs Jackson recorded with the duo, in addition to "SloLove", "I'm Here" and "Put Your Hands On"; the latter two were only included on the Japanese version of the album. It was recorded at Murlyn Studios in Stockholm, Sweden and The Village in Los Angeles, California. The duo specifically desired to work with Jackson prior to their collaboration, with Anders Bagge stating, "That's my dream, she's the one I would give anything to work with. The ultimate female artist", and Arnthor Birgisson adding, "let's just say we will definitely be prepared if and when that happens". In the United States, it was released on May 17, 2004, as the third single from Damita Jo, following "Just a Little While" and "I Want You". In addition, Jackson also considered "All Nite (Don't Stop)" as the album's lead before selecting "Just a Little While". A dancehall-influenced remix known as the So So Def remix features Elephant Man and was produced by L'Roc and Jermaine Dupri, and included in some releases of the single.

Composition
  

"All Nite (Don't Stop)" is an electro-funk and RnB song, while taking influences from samba, Latin, dance-pop  and dancehall. Its melody is built around a sample of Herbie Hancock's 1975 song "Hang Up Your Hang Ups". Jackson's vocals are delivered in a breathy falsetto over an "impossibly lithe bassline" described as "a bitch slap" to the senses, according to Spence D. from IGN website.
  
Lyrically, "All Nite (Don't Stop)" discusses being addicted to dancing in a club setting, using metaphors to describe the intense feelings experienced. The song opens with Jackson announcing, "attention, it's time to dance", before comparing various situations with frenetic movement, such as earthquakes, masturbation, pole dancing, a corkscrew, and computer hacking with jerking, popping, breakdancing, shaking, and twerking. Veronica Heffernan of The New York Times said that the lyrics presented Jackson as "a demanding choreographer" with "drill-sergeant attitude", complemented by the singer's "sweetheart voice".

Critical reception

Mike Trias of Radio and Records said the track "should not be ignored, especially on the dance floor. Its sexy, midtempo groove is perfect for kicking a party into after hours". Gail Mitchell of Billboard commended it as a "beat-bangin' number" with "infectious allure", affirming that "Jackson steps back into her signature groove line with this bass-driven party jam". Mitchell also regarded it as among Jackson's strongest material, adding that its chorus and "relentless beat" will remain "embedded in your consciousness long after the last note has sounded". Tareck Ghoneim of Contactmusic.com considered it an "interesting" and "infectious" blend of "upbeat samba/dance rhythms and definite funk influence", with "[e]lectro samples, latin percussion and some groans and breaths to give it a sexy ambience". Its aura "on a rnb tip" was considered to have "loads of crossover potential" for several airplay formats. Ghoneim added, "it certainly doesn't strike me as a typical Janet record", citing it as another evolution from "those 'Nasty' days" in "maintaining that dance-pop influence but making it slightly more cool". Chuck Arnold of People described it as a "hypnotic pop number", while The Baltimore Sun labeled it a "get-on-up dance cut" which "rides a looping funk guitar line".

The New York Times praised its "clubby, big-room beats", analyzing its production as "strictly machine-made, with Jackson's sweetheart voice protected by layers of effects". Its "bossy" lyrics were likened to being "spoken by a demanding choreographer or a bullying boyfriend", which transitions from "1–900 confessionalism" to "drill-sergeant attitude". Spence D. of IGN heralded the song as an electro funk number which effectively "gets the blood pumping and the booty primed for shaking". Alexis Petridis of The Guardian called it "a nervy tune", noting the song's "impossibly lithe bassline", while praising it as "not only inventive, but brilliantly constructed". Slant Magazine called it a "pulsating club track", while San Francisco Chronicle regarded it as the best song from the album, and the best dance song since New Order's "Bizarre Love Triangle". Pitchforks Chris Ott called it "genius" and rated it three and a half out of four stars, qualifying it as part of the "mashup craze" in which artists were "dreaming up new, ear-catching juxtapositions to dazzle radio". Ott labeled it as "a notable standout" while praising the track's "borderline dancehall/Latin club rhythms". BBC UK's Top of the Pops website exclaimed the track "hits you with about three different basslines and a bonafide booty-quaker of a beat", transitioning into one of her "classic Jackson key-changes" during the chorus. Asian entertainment outlet Fridae qualified it as "chart-friendly", "bass-line driven", and "burning from the explicit references". Tom Moon of The Philadelphia Inquirer called it a moment "when everything clicks", adding its "primal quality" ultimately "juxtaposes Jackson's ethereal yearning against agitated synthesizers". "All Nite (Don't Stop)" won the award for Best Pop Song at the 2005 BMI London Awards.

Chart performance
The song's chart success was largely affected by the blacklist of Jackson's singles and music videos which followed her controversial Super Bowl halftime show incident. It peaked at number 33 on Billboards Mainstream Top 40 chart, number 19 on Bubbling Under Hot 100 Singles, and number one on Hot Dance Club Play. It also reached number eight on Hot Dance Airplay. In March 2008, after the release of Jackson's tenth studio album Discipline, the song reached number 40 the Hot Singles Sales chart, four years after its initial release. Internationally, it was released as a double A-side with "I Want You". In Australia, "All Nite (Don't Stop)" debuted and peaked at number 24 on the issue dated July 4, 2004, staying on the ARIA Charts for 10 weeks. In New Zealand, it peaked at number 39 during its only week on the chart.

In the United Kingdom, "All Nite (Don't Stop)" debuted and peaked at number 19 on the UK Singles Chart on the week of June 19, 2004, spending five weeks on the chart. Music Week magazine noted that despite Jackson's high-profile promotional visit to the region, she had not had a top 10 single since "All for You" (2001). In Belgium, it peaked at number 21 in the Flemish region, while reaching one position lower in Wallonia. In Italy, the song entered the singles chart at number 47, and reached number 30 weeks later, spending five weeks inside the chart. In the Netherlands, "All Nite (Don't Stop)" entered the singles' chart at number 95 during the week of June 26, 2004. It eventually reached number 35, staying a total of five weeks on the chart. On the Swiss Singles Chart dated June 20, 2004, "All Nite (Don't Stop)" debuted at number 78, reaching its peak of number 76 the next week, spending only four weeks on the chart.

Music video

The music video for "All Nite (Don't Stop)" was directed by Francis Lawrence, who previously directed "Someone to Call My Lover" and several of Jackson's other videos, and edited by Dustin Robertson. It was filmed from April 16–17, 2004 and premiered online on May 13, 2004. The video was filmed at the abandoned El Dorado Hotel in the Skid Row neighborhood of Los Angeles, California. Choreographed by Gil Duldulao, it took a minimal approach in comparison to Jackson's prior clips, focusing heavily on intricate choreographed routines as well as gay-friendly themes amongst several of Jackson's dancers. The setting of the music clip is inside a "derelict" building during a power outage. The video begins with Jackson's dancers sprawled on bordello furniture in a "cavernous" ballroom inside the building where the air is "cloudy with sawdust or dance chalk". Then one of the dancers winds a copper wire from a stereo system around a car battery to generate power in the abandoned building. Jackson is then shown, her face covered with a hat and long bangs. As the video progresses, Jackson switches between solo and group dancing, schowcasing snapping, jerking, jazz, hip-hop, and yoga-influenced moves, including scenes where Jackson simulates masturbation as her dancers perform similar suggestive moves. The video closes with the illumination of a neon Damita Jo logo, used to "turn the makeshift studio into a real stage set". After Jackson's Super Bowl halftime show incident, MTV and many other music channels owned by companies involved in producing the event blacklisted her videos from rotation. However, a slightly edited version was shown on channels such as MuchMusic and BET.

Reception
Virginia Heffernan of The New York Times praised the video as being "clever", "brave", and "sexually restless" with "adventures in exhibitionism [that] often seem to involve relatively small patches of skin, coupled with raunchy gyrations". She compared the video's theme of "orgiastic dancing by candlelight" to the Northeast blackout of 2003, using the "civics lesson" of a dancer winding a copper wire from a stereo system around a car battery to generate power in an abandoned building. Hefferanan concluded that the "lo-fi" choreography of the clip is in opposition to making "a gaudy show of her rapport with her dancers". The New York Blade considered it "certainly provocative", as "Jackson and her dancers get hot and heavy with one another to the song's thumping, infectious beat", while King Magazine placed the video as third on their list of "Favorite Janet Jackson Videos", describing it as "lots of writhing". The video received several nominations on awards, such as the 20th Annual International Dance Music Awards, in the category of "Best Dance Video" and "Best Choreography", MVPA Awards for "Best Choreography", with its director Francis Laurence being nominated for "Best Direction of a Female Artist" and winning "Director of the Year", for multiple videos including "All Nite (Don't Stop)".

Censorship
An edited version which removes all sexual content was occasionally aired by remaining video outlets which managed to avoid Jackson's video blacklist, such as MuchMusic and BET. The outlets faced criticism for removing a kiss between two female dancers. Speaking to The New York Blade, GLAAD's entertainment director Stephen Macias commented, "I think it's always a concern when the gay and lesbian community is not allowed to be depicted in the same way that the straight community is, and especially when that revolves around the way our relationships and romantic situations are depicted". Macias added that Jackson supports gay causes and has been persistently active in portraying equality among the gay community and would not approve the edit. The excerpt concluded, "A number of networks and broadcasters have gone to a heightened state of self-censorship since the uproar over Jackson's Super Bowl performance, for fear of being fined".

Live performances

Jackson performed "All Nite (Don't Stop)" for the first time on Good Morning America on March 31, 2004. It was followed by another one at On Air with Ryan Seacrest two days later. Both performances were aired with a time delay per the FCC's guidelines due to her controversial Super Bowl incident. On April 10, the singer was the host and performer on Saturday Night Live, with performances of "All Nite (Don't Stop) and "Strawberry Bounce". Her appearance on the show garnered its highest ratings in over two years.

She also performed the song on The Tonight Show with Jay Leno on April 29, 2004, MSN Music's studios in Seattle on May 14, and the annual Wango Tango the day after. In late May, Jackson traveled to Japan to perform the song on the 2004 Video Music Awards Japan, where she was the recipient of the "Inspiration Award". The singer then traveled to Europe and performed "All Nite (Don't Stop)" on shows such as Italy's Festivalbar, and Top of the Pops. In June, it was performed at the BET Awards in a medley with "R&B Junkie", and at New York's Gay Pride March along with "Together Again".

It was performed on each of Jackson's subsequent tours. It was included on the setlist of her 2008 Rock Witchu Tour, her first in seven years. The song was later included on some shows of the Number Ones, Up Close and Personal tour in 2011, with Jackson dedicating the song to her fans in Jakarta, Indonesia, and Hidalgo, Texas. The singer also performed "All Nite (Don't Stop)" on the 2015–16 Unbreakable World Tour, wearing an arms-length black jumpsuit with an oversized necklace. It was also included on the State of the World Tour in 2017–2019. Jackson also included the song on her 2019 Las Vegas Residency Janet Jackson: Metamorphosis.

Usage in media
British DJ and producer Switch sampled "All Nite (Don't Stop)" on the song "This is Sick" under the stage moniker Solid Groove. Dance troupe Fanny Pak performed the song on an episode of America's Best Dance Crew titled "Janet Jackson Challenge", which paid tribute to her iconic choreography and videos. It was also performed by contestants on Oxygen's Dance Your Ass Off. The song is included in the 18th edition of the Guinness book British Hit Singles & Albums and is mentioned in Nicole Austin's novel The Boy Next Door.

In March 2018, singer Britney Spears posted a video working out to "All Nite (Don't Stop)" on her Instagram account. The song entered the top 200 of iTunes afterwards.

Track listings

 iTunes EP
 Album Version – 3:26
 "I Want You" – 4:12
 "Put Your Hands On" – 3:56
 Sander Kleinenberg's Radio Mix – 4:14
 "I Want You" (Ray Roc Radio Mix) – 4:18

 UK promotional 12-inch single
 Sander Kleinenberg Club Mix – 8:50
 Low End Specialists Main Mix – 8:48

 UK 12-inch single
 Album Version – 3:26
 Sander Kleinenberg Everybody Club Mix – 8:50
 "I Want You" – 4:12
 So So Def Remix – 3:51

 UK CD single
 Album Version – 3:26
 "I Want You" – 4:12
 "Put Your Hands On" – 3:56
 Sander Kleinenberg's Radio Mix – 4:14
 "I Want You" (Ray Roc Radio Mix) – 4:18
 "All Nite (Don't Stop)" (Video)
 "I Want You" (Video)

 US promotional 12-inch single
 "All Nite (Don't Stop)" (So So Def Remix) – 3:51
 "All Nite (Don't Stop)" (So So Def Instrumental) – 3:48
 "All Nite (Don't Stop)" (A Cappella) – 3:51
 R&B Junkie – 3:11
 R&B Junkie (Instrumental) – 3:11
 "All Nite (Don't Stop)" (Clean Version) – 3:28

 US promotional double 12-inch single
 Sander Kleinenberg Everybody Remix – 8:40
 Low End Specialists Main Mix – 8:48
 Sander Kleinenberg Dub – 8:40
 Low End Specialists Dub – 8:48

 US promotional CD single
 So So Def Remix – 3:51
 So So Def Remix Instrumental – 3:48
 So So Def A Cappella – 3:51
 Album Version – 3:28

 US CD single
 Album Version – 3:26
 "I Want You" – 4:12
 "Put Your Hands On" – 3:56

 European CD single
 Album Version – 3:26
 "I Want You" – 4:12

 Australian CD single
 Album Version – 3:26
 "I Want You" – 4:12
 "Put Your Hands On" – 3:56
 Sander Kleinenberg's Radio Mix – 4:14

 Japanese CD single
 Album Version – 3:26
 Sander Kleinenberg Everybody Club Mix – 8:42
 "I Want You" – 4:12
 So So Def Remix – 3:51

Credits and personnel
Credits and personnel are adapted from Damita Jo album liner notes.

 Janet Jackson – vocals, songwriter, producer
 James Harris III – songwriter
 Terry Lewis – songwriter
 Tony "Prof T" Tolbert – songwriter
 Anders Bagge – songwriter, producer, arranger, programmer, recording
 Arnthor Birgisson – songwriter, producer, arranger, programmer, recording
 Herbie Hancock – songwriter
 Paul Jackson – songwriter

 Melvin Ragin – songwriter
 Lee Gloves – programming
 Rob Haggett – assistant programming
 Anders Herrlin – additional programming
 Jennie Löfgren – additional programming
 Henrik Brunberg – assistant engineer
 Mark "Spike" Stent – mixing
 David Treahearn – assistant mixing

Charts

Weekly charts

Year-end charts

Release history

References

External links
 Official music video — YouTube

2004 singles
2004 songs
Janet Jackson songs
Music videos directed by Francis Lawrence
Songs about dancing
Songs written by Anders Bagge
Songs written by Arnthor Birgisson
Songs written by Janet Jackson
Songs written by Jimmy Jam and Terry Lewis
Virgin Records singles